Palkanlu-ye Olya (also Romanized as Pālkanlū-ye ‘Olyā; also known as Pālkānlū-ye Bālā, Palkanlu, and Pānkānlū-ye ‘Olyā) is a village in Shahrestaneh Rural District, Now Khandan District, Dargaz County, Razavi Khorasan Province, Iran. At the 2006 census, its population was 408, in 113 families.

References 

Populated places in Dargaz County